Sushi pizza is a  Canadian dish that originated from Toronto and a fusion of sushi and pizza often served in the Greater Toronto Area, invented by Kaoru Ohsada no later than May 1993 as a Nami Japanese Seafood Restaurant chef. It uses a slightly crispy yet chewy fried rice patty as the base and is topped with a layer of sliced avocado, a layer of sliced salmon, tuna or crab meat, a drizzle of blended mayonnaise and wasabi powder and is served in wedges. Nori, pickled ginger, and roe are sometimes also served as toppings or sides.

Due to the popularity and wide availability of the dish in Toronto, it has quickly become one of the city's signature dishes, along with the peameal bacon sandwich.

See also
 Canadian cuisine
 Cuisine of Toronto
 Sushi burrito
 Fusion cuisine

References

Canadian cuisine
Toronto cuisine
Pizza varieties
Sushi in the United States